James Richard "Jim" Poole (February 6, 1932–November 7, 2021) was an American badminton player who won national and international championships between 1958 and 1979, and a National Football League official.

Career
Though he did not focus on the sport until the late 1950s when in his mid twenties, Jim Poole went on to have a remarkably long career in high level badminton. He rated among the world's leading singles players in the early 1960s, during which time he became the first of only four non-Asians to win the Malaya (Malaysia) Open singles title (1961). Poole won the U.S. Open singles title in 1958 and 1961 and reached the final of both the U.S. and Irish Opens in 1968 at age 36. He probably played the best doubles of his career while approaching forty in the late 1960s and early 1970s, during an eleven-season partnership with fellow left-hander Don Paup. They reached the finals of the U.S. Open five times in nine tries, winning twice, while capturing all five of the closed national championships that they contested as a team. The 21-year span from Poole's first to last U.S. title is the longest of any player. Noted for his shot-making accuracy and consistency, and for his tactical astuteness, Poole was a member of seven consecutive US Thomas Cup (men's international) teams from 1958 through 1976. He won over 70 percent of his matches in these contests, which included three inter-zone campaigns (1958, 1961, 1967). In 1970, he was elected into the U.S. Badminton Hall of Fame, now called the Walk of Fame.

An all-around athlete who played basketball and baseball for San Diego State University, Poole was a member of the winning US Pan-American Games Basketball Team in 1955. From 1975 to 1995 he officiated National Football League games, wearing number 92 and working in two Super Bowls as a back judge.

Later life and death
After retiring from the NFL, Poole worked as supervisor in New York City. He moved to Arizona where he would work as an officiating observer and trainer for the NFL at Arizona Cardinals home games.
Poole died November 7, 2021, in Blacksburg, Virginia, after a brief battle with cancer.

Major achievements

International tournaments 
Men's singles

Men's doubles
{| class="sortable wikitable" style="font-size: 90%;"
! Year
! Tournament
!Partner
! Opponent
! Score
! Result
|- 
| align="center" |1960
|U.S. Open
| Manny Armendariz
| Finn Kobbero Charoen Wattanasin
|
| style="text-align:left; background:white" | Runner-up
|- 
| align="center" |1962
|Canadian Open
| Bobby Williams
| Ferry Sonneville Jim Carnwath
| 15-6, 15-8
| style="text-align:left; background:white" | Winner
|-
| align="center" |1964
|U.S. Open
| Mike Hartgrove
| Joe Alston Wynn Rogers
| 2-15, 15-12, 10-15
| style="text-align:left; background:white" | Runnerup|-
| align="center" |1965
|Canadian Open
| Channarong Ratanaseangsuang
| Eiichi Sakai Takeshi Miyanaga
|15–10, 18–15
| style="text-align:left; background:white" | Winner|-
| align="center" |1966
|U.S. Open
| Don Paup
| Ng Boon Bee Tan Yee Khan
| 6-15, 12-15
| style="text-align:left; background:white" | Runner-up|-
| align="center" |1968
|U.S. Open
| Don Paup
| Eiichi Sakai Takeshi Miyanaga
| 15-8, 15-18, 17-15
| style="text-align:left; backgound:white" | Winner|-
| align="center" |1970
|U.S. Open
| Don Paup
| Junji Honma Ippei Kojima 
| 14-17, 2-15
| style="text-align:left; background:white" | Runner-up|-
| align="center" |1971
|U.S. Open
| Don Paup
| Ng Boon Bee Punch Gunalan
|15-2, 13-18, 7-15
| style="text-align:left; background:white" | Runner-up|-
| align="center" |1973
|U.S. Open
| Don Paup
| Derek Talbot Mike Tredgett
| 11-15, 15-11, 15-12
| style="text-align:left; background":white" | Winner'|}Mixed doubles''

References

1932 births
Living people
American male badminton players
National Football League officials